Joe Boxers may refer to:

Joe Boxer, a brand of underwear
JoBoxers, a British rock band active 1982–1985